Caryocar (souari trees) is a genus of flowering plants, in the South American family Caryocaraceae described as a genus by Linnaeus in 1771. It is native primarily to South America with a few species extending into Central America and the West Indies.

Caryocar consists of trees that yield a strong timber.  Some of the species  within the genus Caryocar have edible fruits, called souari-nuts or sawarri-nuts. The most well-known species is probably the Pekea-nut (C. nuciferum). In Brazil the Pequi (C. brasiliense) is most popular; it has a variety of uses, not the least among them being the production of pequi oil. Furthermore, some species are used by indigenous peoples to produce poisons for hunting.

Species
 Caryocar amygdaliferum Mutis - Colombia, Panama
 Caryocar amygdaliforme G.Don - Ecuador, N Peru
 Caryocar brasiliense A.St.-Hil. - Brazil, Bolivia, Paraguay
 Caryocar coriaceum Wittm. - N Brazil
 Caryocar costaricense Donn.Sm. - Costa Rica
 Caryocar cuneatum Wittm. - Brazil
 Caryocar dentatum Gleason - NW Brazil, Bolivia
 Caryocar edule Casar. - Bahia, Rio de Janeiro
 Caryocar glabrum (Aubl.) Pers. - French Guiana, Suriname, Guyana, Venezuela, Colombia, Ecuador, Brazil
 Caryocar microcarpum Ducke - Lesser Antilles, French Guiana, Suriname, Guyana, Venezuela, Colombia, Ecuador, Brazil, Bolivia
 Caryocar montanum Prance - Guyana, Bolívar, Roraima
 Caryocar nuciferum L. - Pekea-nut, Butter-nut of Guinea - St. Kitts, St. Vincent, French Guiana, Suriname, Guyana, Venezuela, N Brazil
 Caryocar pallidum A.C.Sm. - NW Brazil, S Venezuela, Bolivia
 Caryocar villosum (Aubl.) Pers. - French Guiana, Venezuela, N Brazil, Colombia

References

External links

  (1946). Frutas Indígenas [in Portuguese]. Instituto de Botânica da Secretaria de Agricultura, Indústria e Comércio de São Paulo.
photo of herbarium specimen at Missouri Botanical Garden, collected in Panama, Caryocar amygdaliferum
photo of Caryocar costaricense, taken in Costa Rica by Reinaldo Aguilar

 
Malpighiales genera